Ursula Appolloni (née Carroll; 7 December 1929 – 28 December 1994) was a Canadian politician. She served in the House of Commons as a Liberal Member of Parliament for the Toronto ridings of York South and York South—Weston from 1974 to 1984.

Background
Appolloni was born in Cavan, Ireland as Ursula Carroll, and she served in Britain's Women's Royal Air Force from 1948 to 1950. In 1954 she met her future husband, Lucio, who at the time was working at the Italian consulate in Liverpool, England. They married in 1958 in Italy where they resided until 1965. She became fluent in Italian. They had four children together, Luisa, Suzanne, Andrew, and Simon. Eventually they emigrated to Canada and settled in Toronto. Prior to entering politics, she was a freelance writer with numerous articles published in the Toronto Telegram, Toronto Star and Catholic Register and she worked as chairman of the Board of Referees, Employment and Immigration Canada. Appolloni also directed a children's mime opera. After her election in 1974 they moved to Ottawa where they remained until her death.

Politics
Appolloni was first involved in politics when she served as office manager for the campaign of Charles Caccia in the 1968 election. In 1974 she ran as the Liberal Party candidate in the riding of York South against New Democratic Party leader David Lewis in the federal election. Appolloni upset Lewis by 1,863 votes ending Lewis' political career. At his defeat, Lewis joked "One of the basic democratic rights is the right for the people to be wrong." Her husband, Lucio, had been the Liberal candidate in York South in the 1972 election. He lost to Lewis by almost 5,000 votes.

She remained as MP for York South and its successor riding, York South—Weston, until she retired in 1984. She was a backbencher for most of her parliamentary career, except for serving as Parliamentary Secretary to the Minister of National Defence from 1980 to 1982. Issues that she supported during her tenure included the creation of pensions for housewives and putting unemployed youth in the military reserve. She supported the abolition of the death penalty and was an anti-abortionist. Some argued that it was her anti-abortion stance that kept her out of cabinet.

Later life
After leaving politics she worked as an editor for Health and Welfare Canada. A long-time smoker, she was diagnosed with lung cancer in June 1994 and died seven months later. Fellow Liberal Charles Caccia described her as "a person with a very big social conscience, with a particular interest in pensioners, women's rights and social justice."

Electoral record

York South

|-
 
|Liberal
|Ursula Appolloni
|align="right"| 12,485 

|New Democratic Party
|David Lewis
|align="right"| 10,622  
 
|Progressive Conservative
|Paul J. Schrieder
|align="right"| 5,557 

|Independent
|Richard Sanders
|align="right"| 103 

|Independent
|Robert Douglas Sproule
|align="right"|97

York South-Weston

References

External links

1929 births
1994 deaths
People from County Cavan
20th-century Irish people
20th-century Canadian politicians
Women members of the House of Commons of Canada
Irish emigrants to Canada
Liberal Party of Canada MPs
Members of the House of Commons of Canada from Ontario
Politicians from County Cavan
Women in Ontario politics
Women's Royal Air Force airwomen
20th-century Canadian women politicians
Deaths from lung cancer in Ontario